Jenny was originally the diminutive form of Jane, but it is now associated with Jennifer.

It may also be spelled Jennie, which was the most common spelling before the 20th century.

People with the given name 
 Jenny Agutter (born 1952), English actress
 Jenny-Wanda Barkmann (c. 1922–1946), German concentration camp guard executed for war crimes
 Jenny Beavan (born 1950), English costume designer
 Jenny Berggren (born 1972), Swedish singer
 Jenny Berrigan (born 1983), American snowboarder
 Jenny Berthelius (1923–2019), Swedish crime novelist and children's writer 
 Jennie Bimson (born 1976), English field hockey player
 Jennie M. Bingham (1859-1933), American writer
 Jenny Body, British aerospace engineer
 Jennie Bond (born 1950), English journalist
 Jenny Buckley (born 1979), Irish television presenter
 Jenny Campbell (artist) (1895–1970), New Zealand artist
 Jennie Carignan, Canadian general
 Jennie Casseday (1840–1893), American philanthropist
 Jennie Chen (1906–1971), second wife of Chiang Kai-shek
 Jennie Churchill (1854–1921), British-American socialite
 Jennie Thornley Clarke (1860-1924), American educator, writer, and anthologist
 Jennie Collins (1828–1887), American labor reformer, humanitarian, and suffragist 
 Jennie Maria Drinkwater Conklin (1841–1900), American author and social activist
 Jenny Craig (entrepreneur) (born 1932), American weight-loss guru
 Jenny Crain (born 1968), American long-distance runner
 Jenny Diver (née Mary Young, c.1700–1741), British pickpocket,
 Jenny Frost (born 1978), British singer and television presenter
 Jenny Gal (born 1969), Dutch-Italian judoka
 Jennie Garth (born 1972), American actress
 Jenny Gusyk (1897–1944), Turkish-Jewish woman enrolled as the first female and foreign student at the University of Cologne
 Jennie Hallam-Peel, British debutante and lawyer, chairwoman of the Queen Charlotte's Ball
 Jenny Han (born 1980), Korean-American author of young adult fiction and children's fiction
 Jenny Hiloudaki, Greek model and TV personality
 Jenny Hval, Norwegian musician, writer, filmmaker, and artist
 Jenny Karezi (1932–1992), Greek film and stage actress
 Jenny (Jane) Kenney (1884–1961), British suffragette and Montessori teacher
 Jennie Kim (born 1996), South Korean rapper, singer, dancer, model and member of Blackpink
 Jenny Lee (born 1996), South Korean singer and member of DIA
 Jenny Lewis, (born 1976), American singer
 Jenny Likens (1950–2004), American child abuse witness, sister of Sylvia Likens
 Jenny Lind, (1820–1887), Swedish soprano
 Jennifer Lopez (born 1969), American singer and actress
 Jenny Marcroft (born 1963) New Zealand politician
 Jenny Mastoraki, Greek poet and translator
 Jenny McCarthy (born 1972), American model, comedian, actress, author and screenwriter
 Jenny McCudden, Irish journalist
 Jenny B. Merrill (1854–1934), American educator, author
 Jennie de la Montagnie Lozier (1841–1915), American physician
 Jenny Nimmo (born 1944), British fantasy author
 Jenny Ohlsson, Swedish ambassador
Jenny Park (born 1984 as Park Bom), Korean singer, model, and former member of 2NE1
Jenny Pat (1981–2014), Hong Kong-born, Chinese-Canadian international art dealer, visual artist, and television personality
 Jenny Pavley (born 1976), American beach volleyball player
 Jenny Pike (1922–2004), Canadian photographer and servicewoman
 Jenny Powell (born 1968), British television presenter
 Jenny Shepherd (born 1972), New Zealand field hockey player
 Jenny Sjödin (born 1985), Swedish professional wrestler and submission grappler
 Jenny Slate (born 1982), American comedian, actress, voice actress and author
 Jennie Somogyi, American retired ballet dancer, former New York City Ballet principal dancer
 Jennie O. Starkey (ca. 1856 – 1918), American journalist
 Jenny Tonge, Baroness Tonge, (born 1941), British politician
 Jenny Vanou, Greek singer
 Jenny von Westphalen (1814–1881), German political activist, theater critic, wife of Karl Marx
 Jenny Whittle (born 1973), Australian basketball player
 Jenny Wolf (born 1979), German speed skater

Fictional characters 
 Jenny, a character in the 1984 American musical comedy movie The Muppets Take Manhattan
 Jenny, a character in the 2001 American independent comedy-drama movie Little Secrets
 Jenny (Doctor Who), in the 2008 Doctor Who episode "The Doctor's Daughter"
 Jenny, a North American Wild Kratts Kid from the hybrid live action/animated series Wild Kratts
 Jenny Flint, part of a trio who occasionally helps the Doctor in Doctor Who
 Jenny in the Wayside School books and cartoon
 Jenny, the main female character in Larry Clark's film Kids
 Jenny Ballinger, a character in the TV sitcom The Ropers
 Jenny Bradley, a character in the British soap opera Coronation Street
 Jenny Cavalleri, female protagonist in Love Story
 Jenny Curran, love interest of the protagonist in the film Forrest Gump
 Jenny Everywhere, open-source comic character
 Jenny Foxworth in the  film Oliver & Company
 Jenny Hayden, a character in the 1984 American science fiction romance movie Starman
 Jenny Humphrey in Gossip Girl and It Girl
 Jenny Kelly, best friend of Sabrina the Teenage Witch during season 1
 Jenny Lerner, a character in the 1998 American science-fiction disaster movie Deep Impact
 Jenny McBride, a mouse from The Secret of NIMH 2: Timmy to the Rescue
 Jenny Pizza in Steven Universe
 Jenny Reilly in The Black Donnellys
 Jenny Romano, a character from The Darkness (video game)
 Jenny Schecter, a main character from The L Word
 Jenny Shepard in the television series NCIS
 Jenny Scott in the 1991 thriller Shattered
 Jenny Skoutari, the protagonist in the film Jenny Jenny by Dinos Dimopoulos
 Jenny Sparks and Jenny Quantum in The Authority comic books
 Jenny Szalinski in Honey, We Shrunk Ourselves
 Jenny Wakeman in the Nickelodeon cartoon My Life as a Teenage Robot
 Jenny Wolek in the soap opera One Life to Live
 Jenny The Witch in the film Big Fish (2003) and the novel Big Fish: A Novel of Mythic Proportions (1998)
 Jenny Woodentop, a character from the 1950s puppet series The Woodentops
 First Mate Jenny, Aldebaran pilot of the Righteous Indignation in the 1980s comic (and later cartoon) series Bucky O'Hare
 Low-Dive Jenny/Ginny Jenny in The Threepenny Opera, based on Jenny Diver
 Officer Jenny, the name of the many police officers in Pokémon

References 

English given names
Feminine given names
Hypocorisms
English feminine given names